Indian Cricketers Association (ICA) is the national union of Indian retired professional cricketer's, which formed for welfare of former players. It is a non-profit organization, it is recognised by Board of Control for Cricket in India. 

It was formed on 5 July 2019, after the Supreme Court of India appointed Lodha Committee's recommendation to form a indipendent organisation for welfare of Indian cricketers. But this association of cricketers is very different from others cricketers' association because it only have retired cricketer and BCCI don't allow any active player to be member of it. While similar players association in other nations allow their present cricketers to be part of players unions.  
Anushaman Gaikwad is its present president.  On 5 July 2019, BCCI recognised it as the representative of former players. But only former male and female cricketers can be part of it. This union's member are appointed as its representatives in BCCI's apex council and IPL's administrative council.

History
Kapil Dev, Anjit Agarkar and Shanta Rangaswamy were the board of directors.

Organisation
Present board of directors of it include - Anshuman Gaekwad (president), members representative : Shanta Rangaswamy, MV Krishnaswamy , Yajuvendra Singh Bilkha. 

ICA representative in BCCI and Indian Premier League (IPL) : Dilip Balwant Vengsarkar (male representative in BCCI's apex council), Pragyan Ojha (IPL governing council representative)

References  
Trade unions established in 2019 
Cricket in India
Sports trade unions
 2019 establishments in India